Louis "The Facelifter" Monaco (born April 28, 1968) is a professional boxer in the heavyweight division and the former CAM (Canadian American Mexican) heavyweight champion. Nicknamed "The Facelifter," Monaco is a clubfighter who fought several significant fighters of his era including world champions Buster Douglas, Trevor Berbick, Vitali Klitschko, Lamon Brewster, Michael Dokes, and Eric Esch.

Early life
Monaco turned pro in 1995 at the age of twenty-seven, after a professional bodybuilding career.

Pro career
In Monaco’s second bout, his opponent Eric "Butterbean" Esch quickly connected with a devastating right hand that knocked Monaco out. The referee immediately called a halt to the bout as Monaco lay motionless at the edge of the ring. He would go on to fight Trevor Berbick, Kirk Johnson, Vitali Klitschko, Lamon Brewster, Fres Oquendo, Lance Whitaker, and Maurice Harris. But he also had some notable successes, particularly earlier in his career, when he drew with former kickboxer Rick Roufus, knocked out Peter McNeeley and beat Michael Dokes. Another big win came by knockout over a then-undefeated Kevin McBride.

Buster Douglas
On May 13, 1997, Monaco faced Buster Douglas as part of the former world champion's comeback after six years of inactivity. The fight was carried on national television as part of a USA Tuesday Night Fights program, and was Monaco's first fight since he defeated Dokes. Although Monaco had hurt Douglas and left him on unsteady legs in the first round, Douglas managed to survive to finish the round. As the referee stepped in to separate the two fighters, Monaco caught Douglas flush with a right hook that dropped him to the canvas. Douglas required assistance to rise to his feet, and since the punch came after the bell it was considered a foul and Douglas was given five minutes to recover. He was not able to continue and Monaco was disqualified as a result.

Professional boxing record

|-
|align="center" colspan=8|16 Wins (8 knockouts, 8 decisions), 39 Losses (15 knockouts, 24 decisions), 5 Draws 
|-
| align="center" style="border-style: none none solid solid; background: #e3e3e3"|Result
| align="center" style="border-style: none none solid solid; background: #e3e3e3"|Record
| align="center" style="border-style: none none solid solid; background: #e3e3e3"|Opponent
| align="center" style="border-style: none none solid solid; background: #e3e3e3"|Type
| align="center" style="border-style: none none solid solid; background: #e3e3e3"|Round
| align="center" style="border-style: none none solid solid; background: #e3e3e3"|Date
| align="center" style="border-style: none none solid solid; background: #e3e3e3"|Location
| align="center" style="border-style: none none solid solid; background: #e3e3e3"|Notes
|-align=center
|Loss
|
|align=left| John Wesley Nofire
|TKO
|1
|06/04/2014
|align=left| The Ritz, Raleigh, North Carolina, U.S.
|
|-
|Loss
|
|align=left| Alonzo Butler
|KO
|1
|14/12/2013
|align=left| Mustang Fitness, Oak Ridge, North Carolina, U.S.
|
|-
|Loss
|
|align=left| Kenny Lemos
|UD
|4
|31/08/2012
|align=left| Red and Jerrys, Sheridan, Colorado, U.S.
|
|-
|Loss
|
|align=left| Eric Boose
|TKO
|5
|09/02/2008
|align=left| Rochester, Washington, U.S.
|align=left|
|-
|Draw
|
|align=left| Donnell Wiggins
|MD
|10
|19/01/2008
|align=left| Tacoma, Washington, U.S.
|align=left|
|-
|Win
|
|align=left| Justin Wrede
|KO
|1
|16/03/2007
|align=left| Denver, Colorado, U.S.
|align=left|
|-
|Loss
|
|align=left| Raphael Butler
|DQ
|6
|12/01/2007
|align=left| Minneapolis, Minnesota, U.S.
|align=left|
|-
|Loss
|
|align=left| Joey Abell
|TKO
|4
|13/10/2006
|align=left| Philadelphia, Pennsylvania, U.S.
|align=left|
|-
|Win
|
|align=left| Kenny Lemos
|UD
|6
|22/09/2006
|align=left| Commerce City, Colorado, U.S.
|align=left|
|-
|Loss
|
|align=left| Kertson Manswell
|TKO
|8
|15/06/2006
|align=left| Fyzabad, Trinidad and Tobago
|align=left|
|-
|Loss
|
|align=left| Terry Smith
|UD
|8
|27/04/2006
|align=left| Tulsa, Oklahoma, U.S.
|align=left|
|-
|Loss
|
|align=left| Lance Whitaker
|TKO
|3
|26/08/2005
|align=left| Hollywood, Florida, U.S.
|align=left|
|-
|Loss
|
|align=left| China Smith
|UD
|10
|29/07/2005
|align=left| Sarasota, Florida, U.S.
|align=left|
|-
|Win
|
|align=left| Ross Brantley
|TKO
|2
|15/04/2005
|align=left| Denver, Colorado, U.S.
|align=left|
|-
|Loss
|
|align=left| Eddie Chambers
|UD
|10
|03/12/2004
|align=left| Philadelphia, Pennsylvania, U.S.
|align=left|
|-
|Loss
|
|align=left| Malik Scott
|UD
|8
|04/11/2004
|align=left| San Antonio, Texas, U.S.
|align=left|
|-
|Win
|
|align=left| Shane Sutcliffe
|UD
|10
|24/04/2004
|align=left| Billings, Montana, U.S.
|align=left|
|-
|Draw
|
|align=left| Kenny Lemos
|MD
|6
|28/02/2004
|align=left| Thornton, Colorado, U.S.
|align=left|
|-
|Loss
|
|align=left| Kenny Lemos
|UD
|4
|14/09/2003
|align=left| Johnstown, Colorado, U.S.
|align=left|
|-
|Loss
|
|align=left| Jeremy Williams
|KO
|1
|17/03/2002
|align=left| Oroville, California, U.S.
|align=left|
|-
|Loss
|
|align=left| Malik Scott
|SD
|6
|13/10/2001
|align=left| Atlantic City, New Jersey, U.S.
|align=left|
|-
|Win
|
|align=left| Ritchie Goosehead
|TKO
|2
|25/08/2001
|align=left| New Town, North Dakota, U.S.
|align=left|
|-
|Loss
|
|align=left| Robert Wiggins
|UD
|6
|26/07/2001
|align=left| New York City, New York, U.S.
|align=left|
|-
|Loss
|
|align=left| Zuri Lawrence
|UD
|6
|04/05/2001
|align=left| Uncasville, Connecticut, U.S.
|align=left|
|-
|Loss
|
|align=left| David Defiagbon
|UD
|8
|04/10/2000
|align=left| Canyonville, Oregon, U.S.
|align=left|
|-
|Loss
|
|align=left| Israel Armenta
|KO
|8
|05/05/2000
|align=left| Paradise, Nevada, U.S.
|align=left|
|-
|Win
|
|align=left| Rocky Bentley
|UD
|4
|14/12/1999
|align=left| Indianapolis, Indiana, U.S.
|align=left|
|-
|Win
|
|align=left| Jason Jackson
|KO
|1
|02/12/1999
|align=left| Saint Charles, Missouri, U.S.
|align=left|
|-
|Win
|
|align=left| Chris Thomas
|UD
|4
|16/10/1999
|align=left| Merrillville, Indiana, U.S.
|align=left|
|-
|Win
|
|align=left| Rocky Bentley
|UD
|4
|29/09/1999
|align=left| Chicago, Illinois, U.S.
|align=left|
|-
|Loss
|
|align=left| Maurice Harris
|TKO
|1
|22/05/1999
|align=left| Paradise, Nevada, U.S.
|align=left|
|-
|Loss
|
|align=left| Charles Shufford
|UD
|6
|06/05/1999
|align=left| Tacoma, Washington, U.S.
|align=left|
|-
|Loss
|
|align=left| Ross Puritty
|PTS
|8
|22/04/1999
|align=left| Tulsa, Oklahoma, U.S.
|align=left|
|-
|Draw
|
|align=left| Edward Wright
|PTS
|8
|01/04/1999
|align=left| Worley, Idaho, U.S.
|align=left|
|-
|Loss
|
|align=left| Elieser Castillo
|UD
|8
|30/01/1999
|align=left| Atlantic City, New Jersey, U.S.
|align=left|
|-
|Loss
|
|align=left| Fres Oquendo
|PTS
|6
|11/12/1998
|align=left| Pueblo, Colorado, U.S.
|align=left|
|-
|Loss
|
|align=left| Derrick Banks
|PTS
|6
|07/11/1998
|align=left| Bismarck, North Dakota, U.S.
|align=left|
|-
|Loss
|
|align=left| Lamon Brewster
|KO
|2
|14/06/1998
|align=left| Atlantic City, New Jersey, U.S.
|align=left|
|-
|Loss
|
|align=left| Monte Barrett
|UD
|6
|09/05/1998
|align=left| Atlantic City, New Jersey, U.S.
|align=left|
|-
|Loss
|
|align=left| Vitali Klitschko
|KO
|3
|07/03/1998
|align=left| Cologne, Germany
|align=left|
|-
|Loss
|
|align=left| Anthony Green
|PTS
|8
|27/02/1998
|align=left| Studio City, California, U.S.
|align=left|
|-
|Loss
|
|align=left| Lawrence Clay Bey
|UD
|10
|18/11/1997
|align=left| Upper Marlboro, Maryland, U.S.
|align=left|
|-
|Loss
|
|align=left| Kirk Johnson
|TKO
|7
|12/07/1997
|align=left| Biloxi, Mississippi, U.S.
|align=left|
|-
|Loss
|
|align=left| Gary Bell
|UD
|10
|01/07/1997
|align=left| Wildwood, New Jersey, U.S.
|align=left|
|-
|Win
|
|align=left| Jessie Henry
|KO
|8
|24/05/1997
|align=left| Denver, Colorado, U.S.
|align=left|
|-
|Loss
|
|align=left| James "Buster" Douglas
|DQ
|1
|13/05/1997
|align=left| Biloxi, Mississippi, U.S.
|align=left|
|-
|Win
|
|align=left| Michael Dokes
|PTS
|10
|05/04/1997
|align=left| Denver, Colorado, U.S.
|align=left|
|-
|Win
|
|align=left| Kevin McBride
|TKO
|5
|07/02/1997
|align=left| Las Vegas, Nevada, U.S.
|align=left|
|-
|Loss
|
|align=left| Jeremy Williams
|KO
|3
|19/12/1996
|align=left| Reseda, California, U.S.
|align=left|
|-
|Loss
|
|align=left| Michael Grant
|TKO
|3
|06/10/1996
|align=left| Los Angeles, California, U.S.
|align=left|
|-
|Loss
|
|align=left| Trevor Berbick
|UD
|10
|18/09/1996
|align=left| Westbury, New York, U.S.
|align=left|
|-
| Win
|
|align=left| Peter McNeeley
|TKO
|5
|13/07/1996
|align=left| Denver, Colorado, U.S.
|align=left|
|-
|Loss
|
|align=left| Cody Koch
|UD
|4
|04/06/1996
|align=left| Las Vegas, Nevada, U.S.
|align=left|
|-
|Win
|
|align=left| Mark Connolly
|PTS
|4
|27/04/1996
|align=left| Paradise, Nevada, U.S.
|align=left|
|-
|Win
|
|align=left| Rudy Gutierrez
|TKO
|4
|06/04/1996
|align=left| Boise, Idaho, U.S.
|align=left|
|-
|Draw
|
|align=left| Tyrone Castell
|PTS
|4
|28/03/1996
|align=left| Denver, Colorado, U.S.
|align=left|
|-
|Loss
|
|align=left| Mark Connolly
|UD
|4
|15/03/1996
|align=left| Paradise, Nevada, U.S.
|align=left|
|-
|Draw
|
|align=left| Rick Roufus
|PTS
|4
|26/01/1996
|align=left| Paradise, Nevada, U.S.
|align=left|
|-
|Loss
|
|align=left| Butterbean
|KO
|1
|01/12/1995
|align=left| Indio, California, U.S.
|align=left|
|-
|Win
|
|align=left| Terry Lopez
|SD
|4
|18/08/1995
|align=left| Denver, Colorado, U.S.
|align=left|
|}

References

External links

American boxers of Mexican descent
Heavyweight boxers
Boxers from Denver
1968 births
Living people
American male boxers